Henrique Lordelo Souza de Oliveira (born 16 June 2000), known as Henrique Lordelo, is a Brazilian professional footballer who plays as a defensive midfielder for São Bernardo, emprestado pelo Goiás.

Club career
Born in Rio de Janeiro, Lordelo joined Flamengo's youth setup at the age of ten. In August 2019, he left the club and signed a three-and-a-half-year contract with fellow Série A side Goiás, initially assigned to the under-20s.

Lordelo made his professional – and top tier – debut on 26 November 2020, coming on as a second-half substitute for Daniel Villalva in 1–1 away draw against Fortaleza.

Personal life
Lordelo comes from a family of footballers. His father Paulo Henrique Filho was a forward, while his grandfather Paulo Henrique was a defender; both represented Flamengo.

Career statistics

References

External links
 Futebol de Goyaz profile 

2000 births
Living people
Footballers from Rio de Janeiro (city)
Brazilian footballers
Association football midfielders
Campeonato Brasileiro Série A players
Goiás Esporte Clube players